The 2015 Asian Women's Handball Championship was the 15th edition of the Asian Women's Handball Championship, which took place from 14 to 23 March 2015 at Jakarta, Indonesia. The tournament was held under the aegis of Asian Handball Federation. It also acted as the Asian qualifying tournament for the 2015 World Women's Handball Championship.

Draw
The draw was held on 11 January 2015.

Preliminary round
All times are local (UTC+7).

Group A

Group B

Placement 5th–8th

5–8th place semifinals

Seventh place game

Fifth place game

Final round

Semifinals

Third place game

Final

Final standing

References

External links
Official website
AHF website
Results at todor66

2015
Asian Women's Handball Championship
Asian Women's Handball Championship
2015 Asian Women's Handball Championship
March 2015 sports events in Asia